Thais F. O'Donnell Shuler Blatnik (November 20, 1919 – December 9, 2015) was an American journalist and politician who served in both chambers of the West Virginia Legislature.

Early life and education 
Born in Wheeling, West Virginia, Blatnik grew up in Weirton, West Virginia. She graduated from West Liberty University.

Career 
Blatnik worked as a reporter for the Weirton Daily Times, The Wheeling Intelligencer, and as an editor for the Dominion Post. Blatnik served in the West Virginia House of Delegates from 1977 to 1978 and again from 1980 to 1986. She then served in the West Virginia Senate from 1989 to 1996 as a Democrat.

Personal life 
Blatnik died in Wheeling, West Virginia. Her granddaughter, Amy Shuler Goodwin, is the mayor of Charleston, West Virginia.

References

1919 births
2015 deaths
People from Weirton, West Virginia
Politicians from Wheeling, West Virginia
Journalists from West Virginia
Women state legislators in West Virginia
Democratic Party members of the West Virginia House of Delegates
Democratic Party West Virginia state senators
West Liberty University alumni
21st-century American women